Palicanus is a genus of spiders in the family Miturgidae. It was first described in 1897 by Thorell. , it contains only one species, Palicanus caudatus, found in Myanmar, China, Indonesia, and the Seychelles.

References

Miturgidae
Monotypic Araneomorphae genera
Spiders of Asia
Spiders of Africa